The 1933 Clay Cross by-election was held on 1 September 1933.  The by-election was held due to the death of the incumbent Labour MP, Charles Duncan.

Unusually, the Constituency Labour Party asked for nominations for the vacancy, and published the list: Percy Barstow of the National Union of Railwaymen, former leader of the party Arthur Henderson, Samuel Sales of the Derbyshire Miners' Association, and Ben Smith, former Member of Parliament for Rotherhithe.  Henderson was chosen as the party's candidate, and Herbert Drinkwater acted as his election agent.

Henderson easily won the election.  This was Henderson's fifth by-election victory, having previously won in Burnley in 1924, in Newcastle-upon-Tyne East in 1923, in Widnes in 1919, and in Barnard Castle in 1903.

References

1933 elections in the United Kingdom
1933 in England
1930s in Derbyshire
By-elections to the Parliament of the United Kingdom in Derbyshire constituencies